Choeroniscus (long-tailed bat) is a genus of bat in the family Phyllostomidae.

It contains the following species:
 Godman's long-tailed bat (Choeroniscus godmani)
 Greater long-tailed bat (Choeroniscus periosus)
 Lesser long-tongued bat (Choeroniscus minor)

References

 
Bat genera
Taxa named by Oldfield Thomas
Taxonomy articles created by Polbot